Clemente José Montes Barroilhet (born 25 April 2001) is a Chilean professional footballer who plays as a forward for the Spanish club Celta de Vigo B on loan from Universidad Católica.

Club career

Universidad Catolica
Montes debuted the year 2020 in the match against Santiago Wanderers in San Carlos de Apoquindo, on the following date.

International career
After being called up to the first training microcycle on 2021 of the Chile senior team by Martín Lasarte, he received his first official call up for the friendly match against Bolivia on March 26, 2021, making his international debut at the minute 87 along with his teammate Ignacio Saavedra. In addition, he was in the Chile squad for the 2021 Copa América, but he didn't make any appearance.

Personal life
He has two cousins – brothers to each other – who are professional footballers: the English-born French-Chilean older brother, Richard Barroilhet, who came to Chile on 2017 to join O'Higgins and the French-Chilean younger brother, Jordan Barroilhet, who came to Chile on 2020 to join Deportes Puerto Montt.

Career statistics

Club

International

Honours

Club
Universidad Católica

Primera División: 2020, 2021
Supercopa de Chile: 2020, 2021

References

External links
 

2001 births
Living people
Footballers from Santiago
Chilean footballers
Chilean expatriate footballers
Chile international footballers
2021 Copa América players
Association football forwards
Chilean Primera División players
Club Deportivo Universidad Católica footballers
Primera Federación players
Celta de Vigo B players
Chilean expatriate sportspeople in Spain
Expatriate footballers in Spain
21st-century Chilean people